Paros is a Greek island of the Cyclades.

It can also refer to:
Paros (city), an ancient city located on the island of Paros
Paros (regional unit), an administrative unit that includes the island of Paros
Nahapetavan, a town in Armenia formerly known as Paros
Paroš, a village in Bosnia and Herzegovina
Paroș, a river in Hunedoara County, Romania
Paroș, a village in the commune Sălașu de Sus, Hunedoara County, Romania
Prevention of an Arms Race in Outer Space (PAROS), see list of acronyms: P
Paros, the initial name of the Greek colony which later changed into Pharos (modern Hvar, Croatia)